The Spires is a 426-ft. (130m) tall skyscraper in Houston, Texas. It was completed in 1983 and has 40 floors, making it the 39th tallest building in the city. It is the tallest and most prominent building in Hermann Park, and is visible from the southeast throughout the Houston Zoo. The Spires is a self managed condominium building where homeowners are involved through various committees. The Spires' Board of Directors includes 11 homeowners who meet regularly. The Spires is considered one of the best managed residential highrise buildings in Houston.

See also 
 List of tallest buildings in Houston

References 

 Emporis
 Skyscraperpage

External links 
 Official site

Residential skyscrapers in Houston
Residential condominiums in the United States
Residential buildings completed in 1983
1980s architecture in the United States